Ayaz Hussain Jani,(4 October 1967 – 6 June 2016) was a Sindhi-language poet. He died at the age of 49.

References

1967 births
2016 deaths
Pakistani poets
Sindhi-language poets
Sindhi people
Shah Abdul Latif University alumni